The End of the Innocence is the third solo studio album by Don Henley, the co-lead vocalist and drummer for the Eagles. The album was released in 1989, on Geffen Records, and was his last release on that label. It was also his last solo album of the 1980s and it would be eleven years before he released another solo project, 2000's Inside Job.

The album is Henley's best selling release, moving over 6 million copies in the United States alone, peaking at No. 8. The album featured three Top 40 singles "The End of the Innocence", "The Heart of the Matter", and "The Last Worthless Evening". Those singles reached No. 8, No. 21, and No. 21 respectively. The album also featured "New York Minute" which reached No. 48 on the charts and was recorded by Henley and the Eagles for their live album Hell Freezes Over in 1994. Henley won another Grammy and an MTV Video Music Award nomination for the title track. In 2012, the album was ranked at number 389 on the Rolling Stone magazine's list of the 500 greatest albums of all time.

The song "I Will Not Go Quietly" features harmony vocals by Guns N' Roses singer Axl Rose, who at the time was also on the same label.

Critical reception
Rolling Stone magazine wrote of the album at the time, "Returning to the theme of "Desperado," the former Eagle hitched some of his finest melodies (especially on the gentle title track) to sharply focused lyrical studies of men in troubled transition – from youth to adulthood, innocence to responsibility."

Reviewing retrospectively for AllMusic, critic Vik Iyengar has written of the album, "Henley took some time before completing his highly anticipated third album, The End of the Innocence. Although he manages to duplicate much of the magic of his previous album, Henley has backed off of the synthesizers and expanded his musical palette." They also add that "Throughout the album, he manages to balance being cynical yet hopeful, and his great melodies allow his poignant lyrics to penetrate. This album is highly recommended for those who like their pop music with a message."

Track listing

Personnel 

 Don Henley – lead vocals, drums (1, 4), backing vocals (6, 9), harmony vocals (6, 7)
 Bruce Hornsby – acoustic piano (1), additional keyboards (1)
 Jai Winding – keyboard bass (1), keyboards (5), additional keyboards (6)
 John Corey – keyboards (4), guitars (4, 8), bass guitar (8)
 David Paich – acoustic piano (5), string arrangements (5), additional keyboards (7)
 Danny Kortchmar – guitars (2, 3, 5-7, 9), bass guitar (2, 3, 9), drums (2, 3, 7, 9), guitar solo (3), keyboards (5-7), lead guitar (8)
 Waddy Wachtel – acoustic guitar (3)
 Mike Campbell – additional guitars (4), keyboards (10), guitars (10)
 Bob Glaub – bass guitar (4)
 Pino Palladino – bass guitar (5-7)
 Larry Klein – bass guitar (10)
 Jeff Porcaro – drums (5)
 Steve Jordan – drums (6), wah wah guitar (6), backing vocals (6)
 Michael Fisher – percussion (1)
 Stan Lynch – percussion (4, 9, 10), guitars (8), bass (8), drums (8, 10)
 Jim Keltner – additional percussion (6)
 Wayne Shorter – soprano sax solo (1)
 Steve Madaio – trumpet solo (5)
 Valerie Carter – harmony vocals (2)
 Patty Smyth – harmony vocals (2)
 Axl Rose – harmony vocals (3)
 Take 6 – backing vocals (5, 6)
 Charley Drayton – backing vocals (6)
 Ivan Neville – backing vocals (6)
 Edie Brickell – backing vocals (8)
 Melissa Etheridge – backing vocals (8)
 Sheryl Crow – backing vocals (9)
 Gloria Estefan – backing vocals (9)
 J.D. Souther – backing vocals (9)
 Carmen Twillie – backing vocals (10)
 Julia Waters – backing vocals (10)
 Maxine Waters – backing vocals (10)

Production
 Producers – Don Henley (Tracks 1-10); Bruce Hornsby (Track 1); Danny Kortchmar (Tracks 2, 3, 5-7, 9 & 10); John Corey (Tracks 4 & 8); Stan Lynch (Tracks 4 & 8); Mike Campbell (Track 10).
 Engineer – Shelly Yakus
 Basic Track Recording (Tracks 5, 7 & 9) – Greg Ladanyi 
 Assistant Engineer – Brian Scheuble
 Additional Engineers – Marc DeSisto, Rob Jacobs, Eddie King, Mark McKenna and Bob Vogt.
 Technicians – Dale Asamoto, Stephen Barncard, Bob Borbonus, Fred Bova, Jonathan Little, Lars Lyons, Gary Mannon, Mike Morengell, Gary Myerberg and Mark Opie.
 Additional Assistant Technicians – Tom Banghart, Greg Goodman, Ed Goodreau, Randy Staub and Randall Wine.
 Mixing – Shelly Yakus and Rob Jacobs 
 Mix Assistant – Robert "R.J." Jaczko
 Mastered By Stephen Marcussen at Precision Lacquer (Los Angeles, CA).
 Art Direction – Jeri Heiden
 Front Cover Photo – Ken Nahoum
 Back Cover Photo – Stephen Danelian 
 Inner Sleeve Photos – Stephen Danelian and Albert Tolot

Charts

Certifications

Awards
Grammy Awards

References

Don Henley albums
1989 albums
Albums produced by Danny Kortchmar
Geffen Records albums
Grammy Award for Best Male Rock Vocal Performance